was a video game developer formed by Kouji "Cozy" Okada following his departure from Atlus in 2003. Okada is best known as one of the co-creators of the Megami Tensei franchise, along with its subseries Devil Summoner and Persona.

Monster Kingdom: Jewel Summoner was the first game produced by Gaia. Gaia also assisted Game Republic with Folklores monster-creation system, and its original title was Monster Kingdom: Unknown Realms. Another Gaia game, Coded Soul: Uketsugareshi Idea, was released in 2008 with numerous gameplay elements in common with both Jewel Summoner and Folklore. The developer's website was inactive in 2010, suggesting it closed and its final project, Cosmic Walker for the Wii, was cancelled.

Games developed

References

External links
Gaia Announces Coded Soul for PSP
Kouji Okada Live in Tokyo
Okada Coded Soul
Okada Talks Monster Kingdom
Gaia Video Game Company
IGN Article

Video game companies established in 2003
Video game companies disestablished in 2010
Defunct video game companies of Japan